
Kurt Böhmer (31 December 1892 – 1 October 1944) was an officer in the Kriegsmarine of Nazi Germany who commanded the 9th Security Division from 17 June 1944. He was shot and killed on a hunting trip together with three foresters at Ventspils in Latvia by partisans on 1 October 1944. He was a recipient of the Knight's Cross of the Iron Cross.

Awards
 Iron Cross (1914) 2nd Class (6 January 1916)
 Wehrmacht Long Service Award 4th to 2nd Class (2 October 1936)
Komturkreuz des Spanisch-Marokkanischen Mehdauia-Ordens (13 May 1938)
 Wehrmacht Long Service Award 1st Class (1 April 1939)
 Spanish Cross  in Silver (6 June 1939)
 Clasp to the Iron Cross (1939) 2nd Class (17 April 1940)
 Iron Cross (1939), 1st Class (21 April 1940)
 Minesweeper War Badge (17 January 1941)
 Order of the Cross of Liberty, 1st Class with Swords (12 October 1942)
 Knight's Cross of the Iron Cross on 6 October 1940 as Kapitän zur See and Chief of Staff of the Security Forces of the North Sea

References

Citations

Bibliography

 Dörr, Manfred (1995). Die Ritterkreuzträger der Überwasserstreitkräfte der Kriegsmarine, Band 1: A-K (in German). Osnabrück, Germany: Biblio Verlag. .
 

1892 births
1944 deaths
Military personnel from Magdeburg
People from the Province of Saxony
Imperial German Navy personnel of World War I
Counter admirals of the Kriegsmarine
Recipients of the clasp to the Iron Cross, 2nd class
German military personnel of the Spanish Civil War
Recipients of the Order of the Cross of Liberty, 1st Class
Recipients of the Knight's Cross of the Iron Cross
Kriegsmarine personnel killed in World War II
Reichsmarine personnel